Strathmore railway station is located on the Craigieburn line in Victoria, Australia. It serves the northern Melbourne suburb of Essendon, and opened on 28 October 1890 as North Essendon. It was renamed Strathmore on 1 March 1955.

History
Strathmore station on 28 October 1890, with the railway line past the site of the station originally opening in 1872, as part of the North East line to School House Lane. The station, like the suburb itself, was named after a Presbyterian church which opened in 1936. The church was named by local settler Thomas Napier, who had a property named "Rosebank" in the area. The Strathmore name comes from a valley in Scotland, near where Napier was born.

Located at the point where the original Sydney Road (now Pascoe Vale Road) crossed the railway line via a level crossing, it was considered one of the worst traffic bottlenecks in Melbourne, until grade separation works were completed in 1964.

In 1965, a number of signals at the station were abolished, in conjunction with the replacement of double line block signalling with three position signalling between Broadmeadows and Essendon.

On 24 February 1972, the present station building on Platform 1 was provided.

Platforms and services
Strathmore has two side platforms. It is served by Craigieburn line trains.

Platform 1:
  all stations services to Flinders Street

Platform 2:
  all stations services to Craigieburn

Transport links

Kastoria Bus Lines operates one route via Strathmore station, under contract to Public Transport Victoria:
 : Moonee Ponds Junction – Keilor East

Moreland Buslines operates one route to and from Strathmore station, under contract to Public Transport Victoria:
 : to East Coburg

Gallery

References

External links
 Melway map at street-directory.com.au

Railway stations in Melbourne
Railway stations in Australia opened in 1890
Essendon, Victoria
Railway stations in the City of Moonee Valley